Nayeh (also Romanized as Nāyeh; also known as Nāḩīyeh) is a village in Dastjerd Rural District, Khalajastan District, Qom County, Qom Province, Iran. At the 2006 census, its population was 499, in 166 families.

References 

Populated places in Qom Province

Music